Bolma massieri is a species of sea snail, a marine gastropod mollusk in the family Turbinidae, the turban snails.

Description
The size of the shell attains 90 mm.

Distribution
This marine species is found off South Africa and Mozambique.

References

  Bozzetti, L., 1992. Il genere Bolma nella provincia Sud-Africana (Gastropoda: Turbinidae). La Conchiglia 264: 28-29

External links
 To World Register of Marine Species
 

massieri
Gastropods described in 1992